Janko Mežik (born 23 September 1921, date of death unknown) was a Slovenian ski jumper. He competed in the individual event at the 1948 Winter Olympics.

References

External links
 

1921 births
Year of death missing
Slovenian male ski jumpers
Olympic ski jumpers of Yugoslavia
Ski jumpers at the 1948 Winter Olympics
People from Kranjska Gora